McConnellsburg Historic District is a national historic district located at McConnellsburg, Fulton County, Pennsylvania.  The district includes 142 contributing buildings and 1 contributing site in the central business district and surrounding residential areas of McConnellsburg. The district includes buildings reflective of the Greek Revival, Georgian, and Federal styles.  The buildings date between about 1762 and 1940, and include commercial buildings, institutional buildings, and residential buildings. Notable non-residential buildings include the Fulton County Courthouse (1852), Old Fulton County Jail, former Washington Hotel (1852), and former Albert Stoner Store (1893).  The contributing site is the cemetery associated with the Methodist Episcopal Church. Located in the district and separately listed are the Fulton House and the log cabin of Daniel McConnell.

It was added to the National Register of Historic Places in 1992.

References

Historic districts on the National Register of Historic Places in Pennsylvania
Buildings and structures in Fulton County, Pennsylvania
National Register of Historic Places in Fulton County, Pennsylvania